Universal Accounting Center (UA) is a privately owned training organization located in Salt Lake City, Utah.  Founded in 1979, they offer self-paced home-study courses in accounting, bookkeeping, tax preparation, QuickBooks and marketing that specializes in small business.

History
Universal Accounting was established in 1979.  The training center was founded as Universal Training Systems by Alf Bostrom with the purpose to teach students full-charge bookkeeping and accounting.  It first functioned under the parent company Metropolitan Business Bureau (MBB) which Alf began as a financial consulting firm in 1960.  Through his experience with MBB, Alf established the business model upon which Universal Accounting would be built. Until quite recently, Universal Accounting was run by Alf’s son, Allen Bostrom.

Universal Training Systems initially followed a classroom-based learning model, and the first Universal classroom was opened in Salt Lake City, Utah.  Shortly thereafter, several school locations in California, Colorado, New York and New Jersey were opened and franchised.

In 1992, Alf’s sons, Allen and Ken Bostrom, joined his staff, and in 1994, Alf retired, and Allen Bostrom became president and CEO of the newly named Universal Accounting Center. The school has evolved from offering local live courses to developing and selling home-based study materials for bookkeeping, accounting, tax preparation, QuickBooks and marketing. On April 1st, 2014, Roger Knecht became UAC's new president and CEO; Allen Bostrom remains as the chair of Universal's board of directors.

Accreditation
Universal Accounting has been approved by the California Tax Education Council (CTEC) to offer the Professional Tax Preparer Certification (PTP) as a distance learning course in the state of California. Continuing Professional Education (CPE) credits are awarded for each of Universal’s training programs.  UA has also been accredited by the Better Business Bureau.

Awards and honors
Universal Accounting has ranked for the top 100 fastest growing businesses in Utah since 2004. Universal Accounting also made Inc. 500’s list of America’s fastest growing private companies for 2007, 2008, and 2009. In 2009, Allen Bostrom served as keynote speaker at the 2009 Canadian Bookkeepers Association Conference. Universal Accounting has enrolled over 10,000 students in its various training programs.

Leadership 
Roger Knecht is president and CEO of Universal Accounting Center, Roger Knecht is Vice President of Operations, Clay Neves is the National Seminar Director and Jeff Stone is Internet Manager.

References

External links
 Universal Accounting Center Corporate website

Education in Utah
Accounting education
Organizations based in Utah
1979 establishments in Utah